The , signed as Route 32, is one of the expressway routes of the Hanshin Expressway system serving the Keihanshin area. The route travels from National Route 2 in Chūō-ku, Kobe, then tunnels under Mount Rokkō to Kita-ku where it ends at a junction with the Kita-Kobe Route.

See also

References

External links

Roads in Hyōgo Prefecture
32
2012 establishments in Japan
Road tunnels in Japan